Alas is a surname. Notable people with the surname include:

Dennis Alas (born 1985), Salvadoran footballer
Jaime Alas (born 1989), Salvadoran footballer
José Inocencio Alas (born 1934), Salvadoran Roman Catholic priest
Kevin Alas (born 1991), Filipino basketball player
Leopoldo Alas (1852–1901), Spanish writer
Louie Alas (born 1963), Filipino basketball coach

See also
Sibel Alaş (born 1973), Turkish singer

Spanish-language surnames